The Second Schwesig cabinet is the current state government of Mecklenburg-Vorpommern, sworn in on 15 November 2021 after Manuela Schwesig was elected as Minister-President of Mecklenburg-Vorpommern by the members of the Landtag of Mecklenburg-Vorpommern. It is the 11th Cabinet of Mecklenburg-Vorpommern.

It was formed after the 2021 Mecklenburg-Vorpommern state election by the Social Democratic Party (SPD) and The Left (LINKE). Excluding the Minister-President, the cabinet comprises eight ministers. Six are members of the SPD and two are members of The Left.

Formation 

The previous cabinet was a coalition government of the SPD and Christian Democratic Union (CDU) led by Manuela Schwesig of the SPD, who took office in July 2017.

The election took place on 26 September 2021, and resulted in a significant swing to the SPD, while the CDU and the opposition AfD and The Left suffered losses. The Greens and FDP both re-entered the Landtag with 6%.

Overall, the incumbent coalition was returned with an increased majority. Minister-President Schwesig indicated that she planned to talk to all parties except the AfD; exploratory talks the CDU and The Left were held on 1 October. On 13 October, Schwesig announced that the SPD had voted unanimously to seek coalition negotiations with The Left. Discussions began the following week. The parties finalised their coalition agreement on 5 November and presented it three days later. It was approved by both parties and formally signed on 13 November.

Schwesig was elected as Minister-President by the Landtag on 15 November, winning 41 votes out of 79 cast.

Composition

External links

References 

Politics of Mecklenburg-Western Pomerania
State governments of Germany
Cabinets established in 2021
2021 establishments in Germany
German state cabinets
Current governments